Renate Urne (born 11 June 1982) is a retired Norwegian international handballer. She played in her native Norway for Erdal IL, IL Bjørnar and Tertnes HE, before moving to German side HC Leipzig in 2007. She stayed in Leipzig until her retirement in 2011.

Urne made her debut on the Norwegian national team in 2003, and has played a total of 20 matches and scored 15 goals. She made her final appearance in the national team at the 2009 World Women's Handball Championship against Romania, winning the match 25–24.

References

External links

Norwegian female handball players
1982 births
Living people
Expatriate handball players
Norwegian expatriate sportspeople in Germany